The Florida Civil Rights Hall of Fame honors people who have worked on behalf of civil rights in Florida. It is located in the Florida State Capitol and is administered by the Florida Department of Management Services. It was created in 2010 by unanimous vote of both houses of the Florida Legislature.

In 2019, Florida governor Ron DeSantis added three inductees: attorney Daniel Webster Perkins, Dr. Charles Ullman Smith, and Henry “Hank” James Thomas.

Inductees

This is a sortable table. Click on "Year" and it will sort by year. Click on "Name" and it will aort by first name. The source, which has the person's home town or county and reason for inclusion, is Florida Civil Rights Hall of Fame Inductees, consulted February 6, 2022.

See also
Florida Artists Hall of Fame
St. Augustine Movement

External links
 Florida Civil Rights Hall of Fame home page
Florida Civil Rights Hall of Fame website

References

Movements for civil rights
State halls of fame in the United States
Halls of fame in Florida
Organizations based in Florida
Civil rights movement museums
African-American history of Florida
Organizations established in 2010
Civil rights movement
Tourist attractions in Tallahassee, Florida
African-American tourist attractions in Florida
2010 establishments in Florida